Sailly-lez-Lannoy (literally Sailly near Lannoy) is a commune in the Nord department in northern France. It is part of the Métropole Européenne de Lille.

Heraldry

See also
Communes of the Nord department

References

Saillylezlannoy
French Flanders